Karl Ostricek (10 December 1900 – 7 May 1930) was an Austrian footballer. He played in 17 matches for the Austria national football team from 1921 to 1924.

References

External links
 

1900 births
1930 deaths
Austrian footballers
Austria international footballers
Place of birth missing
Association footballers not categorized by position